The Pipers' Guild is an organisation founded in the United Kingdom in the first half of the 20th century. Members make their own bamboo pipes, similar to tin whistles, and form local ensembles to play these pipes. Margaret James began making these based on a traditional goatherd's pipe in the 1920s and the organization grew from this.

See also
Pipe (instrument)

External links
 Pipers' Guild of Great Britain
 American Pipers' Guild
 French Bamboo Pipers' Guild
 Bamboo Pipers' Guild of Austria
 Italian Bamboo Pipers
 Netherlands Pipers' Guild
 Swiss Pipers' Guild

Flute organizations
Music organisations based in the United Kingdom